Alvarinho or Albariño is a variety of white wine grape grown in Northwest Portugal (Monção and Melgaço) and Galicia (northwest Spain) where it is also used to make varietal white wines. In Portugal it is known as Alvarinho, and sometimes as Cainho Branco, Albariño is the Galician name for the grape.

It was presumably brought to Iberia by Cluny monks in the twelfth century but recent studies point to  Alvarinho/albariño being native to Portugal/Galicia. Both the  Portuguese "Alvarinho" and Galician name "Albariño", derive from albo<albus, meaning "white, whitish". It has locally been thought to be a Riesling clone originating from the Alsace region of France, although earliest known records of Riesling as a grape variety date from the 15th, rather than the 12th, century. It is also theorized that the grape is a close relative of the French grape Petit Manseng.

It should not be confused with the Alvarinho Lilás grape of Madeira.

Major regions
Spain produces Albariño to a significant degree in the Rías Baixas DO, especially in the town of Cambados, Condado do Tea and in Barbanza e Iria. In Portugal it is common in the Vinho Verde region, but it is only authorized to be grown in Monção and Melgaço.  In other locations such as Ribeiro, Lima, Braga or Valdeorras it is often mixed with other grapes such as Loureiro, Godelho, Cainho or Borraçal, Arinto or Treixadura to produce blended wines.  Such blends were common throughout Galicia too until about 1985; when the Rías Baixas DO was established on an experimental basis in 1986, Albariño began to emerge as a variety, both locally and internationally.  Its recent emergence as a variety led the wines to be "crafted for the palates of Europe, America and beyond and for wine drinkers who wanted clean flavors and rich, ripe fruit" and led to wines completely different from those produced across the river in Portugal.

Albariño is now produced in several California regions including the Santa Ynez Valley, Clarksburg, Napa, Edna Valley and Los Carneros AVAs. Albariño is also produced in Oregon, first by Abacela Winery in the Umpqua Valley AVA, and in Washington state.

Albariño is also grown in Uruguay and is produced as a varietal by Bodegas Garzon.

In recent years Albariño attracted the attention of Australian winemakers, several of whom are now producing varietal wines.  However, it has recently been discovered that grape growers and wine makers in Australia have been supplying and selling wrongly labelled Albarino for over a decade. They thought they were pouring money into the market for the Spanish grape, but a French expert visiting Australia raised questions in 2008. DNA testing confirmed that the grapes are in fact French Savagnin, and almost all wine in Australia labelled as Albarino is Savagnin.

Wine characteristics
The grape is noted for its distinctive botanical aroma with a citrous undertone, very similar to that of Viognier, Gewurztraminer, and Petit Manseng, suggesting apricot and peach. The wine produced is unusually light, and generally high in acidity with alcohol levels of 11.5–12.5%. Its thick skins and large number of pips can cause residual bitterness.

Viticulture

For hundreds of years, Albariño/Alvarinho vines could be found growing around the trunks of poplar trees and in bushes along the outside margins of fields — a practice which some growers still use in Portugal's Vinho Verde region. In the middle of the century, however, growers made big investments and became professional grape growers.  In Vinho Verde, the vines are typically trained on high pergolas, which encourages over-cropping, often leading to grapes that are unable to exceed more than 8.5% potential alcohol. When grown in a vineyard, the vines need to be wire trained with large canopies to accommodate the 30 to 40 buds per vine that is typical. The grape responds well to the heat and humidity though the high yields and bunching of clusters usually keep the grapes within the margins of ripeness.

Synonyms
Albariño is also known under the synonyms Albarina, Alvarin Blanco, Alvarinha, Alvarinho, Azal Blanco, Galego and Galeguinho.

See also
List of Portuguese grape varieties

References

Galicia (Spain)
White wine grape varieties
Grape varieties of Spain
Spanish wine